The 1941 Detroit Lions season was their 12th in the league. The team failed to improve on their previous season's output of 5–5–1, winning only four games. They failed to qualify for the playoffs for the sixth consecutive season.

Schedule

Note: Intra-division opponents are in bold text.

Standings

References

External links 
1941 Detroit Lions at Pro Football Reference
1941 Detroit Lions at jt-sw.com
1941 Detroit Lions at The Football Database

Detroit Lions seasons
Detroit Lions
Detroit Lions